Bartolomé Pérez de la Dehesa (1634 – 16 January 1693) was a Spanish painter of the Baroque period.

Born in Madrid, he became the son-in-law and pupil of the painter Juan de Arellano. He is known as a painter of flowers and still life, known as bodegones. He also painted scenography for performances at the theater of Buen Retiro, for which he was named painter of the King without salary in January 1689. He died after falling from a scaffold used to paint the ceiling of the palace of Monteleon, and was buried in the church of San Ildefonso.

Works

Guirnalda de San Francisco de Borja' (c. 1675-80)Basket of Flowers (c.1675-1685)Garland of Flowers with St. Anthony of Padua (1689)Vase of Flowers (two paintings) (c. 1690)the Annunciation of the angel Gabriel (1690)

References

Antonio Palomino, An account of the lives and works of the most eminent Spanish painters, sculptors and architects, 1724, first English translation, 1739, p. 130

Agulló Cobo, Mercedes (1998). Una familia de pintores: los Arellano, en Juan de Arellano 1614-1676 (A Family of Painters: Arellano). Madrid, commissioned by A. E. Pérez Sánchez. .
Gutiérrez Pastor, Ismael, Géneros y colaboraciones en la pintura madrileña del siglo XVII. A propósito de los lienzos de Bartolomé Pérez en el retablo mayor de Santa María de Gumiel de Mercado (Burgos), Anuario del Departamento de Historia y Teoría del Arte (UAM), vol XVIII, 2006, p. 107-123.
Museo del Prado (1995). La belleza de lo real. Floreros y bodegones en el Museo del Prado 1600-1800.'' Madrid, Publyco S.A. .

External links 

 http://www.artnet.com/artist/555985/bartolome-perez.html
 Biography at the Musel del Prado Online Encyclopedia

1634 births
1693 deaths
Artists from Madrid
17th-century Spanish painters
Spanish male painters
Spanish Baroque painters
Spanish bodegón painters